Sabina Akter Tuhin is a Bangladesh Awami League politician and the former Member of Parliament from a reserved seat.

Career
Tuhin was elected to parliament from reserved seat as a Bangladesh Awami League candidate in 2014. On 9 May 2016, her supporters clashed with supporters of fellow Awami League Member of Parliament, Aslamul Haque.

References

Awami League politicians
Living people
Women members of the Jatiya Sangsad
10th Jatiya Sangsad members
21st-century Bangladeshi women politicians
21st-century Bangladeshi politicians
Year of birth missing (living people)